Shoshana Renee Dobson (born March 30, 1989) is a retired American mixed martial artist (MMA) who competed in the Flyweight division. She is most notable for her time in the  Ultimate Fighting Championship (UFC).

Personal life 
Dobson is of Jamaican descent and is openly lesbian.

Mixed martial arts career

Early career 
Dobson started her professional MMA career since 2016 after amassed a record of 3–1, she participated in The Ultimate Fighter 26.

The Ultimate Fighter
In August 2017, it was announced that Dobson would be one of the fighters featured on The Ultimate Fighter 26, where the process to crown the UFC's inaugural 125-pound women's champion would take place.

Dobson, representing team Alvarez, faced Roxanne Modafferi and she lost by TKO due to punches in the first round.

Ultimate Fighting Championship
Dobson made her promotional debut on December 1, 2017 on The Ultimate Fighter 26 Finale against Ariel Beck. She won the fight via a technical knockout in round one. 

Dobson next faced Lauren Mueller at UFC on Fox: Poirier vs. Gaethje on April 14, 2018.
 She lost the fight via unanimous decision.

Dobson faced Sabina Mazo on August 17, 2019  at UFC 241. She lost the fight via unanimous decision.

Dobson faced Priscila Cachoeira (replacing Rachael Ostovich) on February 23, 2020 at UFC Fight Night 168. Dobson lost the fight via knockout in the first round.

Dobson faced Mariya Agapova on August 22, 2020 at UFC on ESPN 15. She won the fight via TKO in the second round, securing the largest betting odds upset in UFC women's history (tied with Holly Holm's upset victory over Ronda Rousey at UFC 193). This win earned her the Performance of the Night award.

Dobson faced promotional newcomer Casey O'Neill on February 20, 2021 at UFC Fight Night 185. She lost the fight via technical knockout in round two.

On March 11, 2021, it was announced that Shana was released from the UFC.

On March 23, 2021, Dobson announced her retirement from MMA.

Championships and accomplishments

Mixed martial arts
Ultimate Fighting Championship
Performance of the Night (One time) 
Tied (with Valentina Shevchenko and Maycee Barber) for the most knockout wins in UFC Flyweight division history (two)
MMA Mania
2020 Upset of the Year vs. Mariya Agapova
Combat Press
2020 Upset of the Year vs. Mariya Agapova
LowKick MMA
2020 Upset of the Year vs. Mariya Agapova
MMAjunkie.com
2020 Upset of the Year vs. Mariya Agapova

Mixed martial arts record

|Loss
|align=center|4–5
|Casey O'Neill
|TKO (punches)
|UFC Fight Night: Blaydes vs. Lewis 
|
|align=center|2
|align=center|3:41
|Las Vegas, Nevada, United States
|
|-
|Win
|align=center|4–4
|Mariya Agapova
|TKO (punches)
|UFC on ESPN: Munhoz vs. Edgar
|
|align=center|2
|align=center|1:38
|Las Vegas, Nevada, United States
|
|-
|Loss
|align=center| 3–4
|Priscila Cachoeira
|KO (punch)
|UFC Fight Night: Felder vs. Hooker
|
|align=center| 1
|align=center| 0:40
|Auckland, New Zealand
|
|-
|Loss
|align=center| 3–3
|Sabina Mazo
|Decision (unanimous)
|UFC 241
|
|align=center| 3
|align=center| 3:00
|Anaheim, California, United States
|
|-
|Loss
|align=center| 3–2
|Lauren Mueller
|Decision (unanimous)
|UFC on Fox: Poirier vs. Gaethje 
|
|align=center| 3
|align=center| 3:00
|Glendale, Arizona, United States
|
|-
|Win
|align=center| 3–1
|Ariel Beck
|TKO (punches)
|The Ultimate Fighter: A New World Champion Finale
|
|align=center| 2
|align=center| 2:53
|Las Vegas, Nevada, United States
|
|-
|Win
|align=center| 2–1
|Rebecca Adney
|Decision (unanimous)
|Xtreme Knockout 35
|
|align=center| 3
|align=center| 3:00
|Dallas, Texas, United States
|
|-
|Loss
|align=center| 1–1
|Nicco Montaño
|Decision (unanimous)
|KOTC: Will Power
|
|align=center| 3
|align=center| 3:00
|Albuquerque, New Mexico, United States
|
|-
|Win
|align=center| 1–0
|Cassandra Spatz
|Decision (unanimous)
|Xtreme Knockout 30
|
|align=center| 3
|align=center| 3:00
|Dallas, Texas, United States
|
|-

|-
| Loss
| align=center | 0–1
| Roxanne Modafferi
| TKO (elbows)
| rowspan=3|The Ultimate Fighter: A New World Champion
|  (air date)
| align=center | 1
| align=center | 1:37
| rowspan=3|Las Vegas, Nevada, United States
| 

|-
| Win
|align=center| 2–0
| Morgan Solis
| TKO (strikes)
| Sugar Creek Showdown 28
| 
|align=center| 2
|align=center| 0:13
| Hinton, Oklahoma, United States
|
|-
| Win
|align=center| 1–0
| Bella Wasserman
| Submission (rear-naked choke)
| Sugar Creek Showdown 24
| 
|align=center| 1
|align=center| 2:24
| Hinton, Oklahoma, United States
|

See also
List of female mixed martial artists

References

External links
 
 

Living people
1989 births
Flyweight mixed martial artists
Ultimate Fighting Championship female fighters
Sportspeople from Miami
Mixed martial artists from Florida
American people of Jamaican descent
American LGBT sportspeople
LGBT mixed martial artists